Jesse Green is an American politician serving as a member of the Iowa Senate from the 24th district. Elected in November 2020, he assumed office on January 11, 2021.

Early life 
Green was born and raised in Harcourt, Iowa. He attended the Community Christian School in Fort Dodge, Iowa. Green worked on his family's farm after high school and later took courses at Emmaus Bible College and Iowa Central Community College.

Career 
Prior to entering politics, Green worked as a Bible teacher. He also owns and operates a farm, where he grows corn, beans, oats, and hay. He was elected to the Iowa Senate in November 2020 and assumed office on January 11, 2021. He also serves as vice chair of the Senate Labor and Business Relations Committee and Senate Education Appropriations Subcommittee.

References 

Living people
Year of birth missing (living people)
People from Webster County, Iowa
Republican Party Iowa state senators